Rock Clift, or High Banks, is a historic home at Matthews, Talbot County, Maryland, United States. It is a two-story, three-bay Flemish bond brick house with dormers and has a one-story four-bay frame addition that was built in two sections. The brick house appears to date from about the 1780s.

Rock Clift was listed on the National Register of Historic Places in 1980.

References

External links
, including photo from 1975, at Maryland Historical Trust

Houses on the National Register of Historic Places in Maryland
Houses in Talbot County, Maryland
Houses completed in 1785
National Register of Historic Places in Talbot County, Maryland